This is a list of women's professional wrestling promotions, sorted by country's and lists both active and defunct "indy promotions" and major promotions.

Japan

United Kingdom

United States

Other Promotions

References 

 
Professional wrestling-related lists
Wrestling promotions